Macón was an undefeated Argentinian Thoroughbred racehorse.

Background 
Macón was bred by Haras Ojo de Agua and foaled in 1922. He was sold as a two-year-old in 1924 and was purchased at a high price by Jorge Mitre for his Stud Don Alfonso.

Racing career 
Macón was undefeated in 15 starts.

Macón debuted in February 1925, winning a 900-meter race.

In the 1925 Gran Premio Carlos Pellegrini, Macón set a record for the race of 3:06, which lasted for many years.

He won the 1926 Gran Premio de Honor by multiple lengths in a time of 3:42.

Macón broke the earnings record in Argentina by winning the 1926 Gran Premio Carlos Pellegrini with earnings of 404,623 pesos.

Stud Record 
Macón was acquired by Haras Argentino to stand at stud. He continued to stand at stud there for the rest of his stud career, and died there in 1945.

Macón peaked on the Argentine sire list in 1933 at fifth. In 1946, he was the leading broodmare sire in Argentina and ranked second in 1944. Macón was the damsire of Filon and Seductor.

Pedigree 

Macón is inbred 3S × 4D to St. Simon, meaning St. Simon appears in the fourth generation on both the sire and dam's side of the pedigree. Macón is also inbred to Galopin 4S × 4D x 5D.

See also 
List of leading Thoroughbred racehorses

References 

Racehorses bred in Argentina
Racehorses trained in Argentina
1922 racehorse births
Thoroughbred family 12-d
Undefeated racehorses